The Miss Iowa competition is the official preliminary for the state of Iowa in the Miss America Scholarship Competition.  

Bailey Hodson of Des Moines was crowned Miss Iowa 2022 on June 11, 2022 at Adler Theatre in Davenport, Iowa. She competed for the title of Miss America 2023 at the Mohegan Sun in Uncasville, Connecticut in December 2022 where she was a Preliminary Social Impact Pitch winner. 

The Miss Iowa Scholarship Competition is a three-day program held in the Davenport, IA every June. During this event, both Miss Iowa and Miss Iowa's Outstanding Teen are crowned. In order to compete for Miss Iowa, you must be at least 17 years old and cannot be over 25 years old before December 31st in the year you hope to compete. In addition, you must reside, work, or attend school in Iowa. You also need to be awarded a preliminary title from a local competition.

No contestant from Iowa has ever won the national Miss America title although two Miss Iowa Titleholders have been named first runner-up. 

Cheryl Browne, Miss Iowa 1970, competed in the Miss America 1971 pageant as the first African American contestant.

Gallery of past titleholders

Results summary
The following is a visual summary of the past results of Miss Iowa titleholders at the national Miss America pageants/competitions. The year in parentheses indicates the year of the national competition during which a placement and/or award was garnered, not the year attached to the contestant's state title.

Placements
 1st runners-up: Joanne MacDonald (1959), Catherine Lemkau (1993)
 2nd runners-up: Susan Thompson (1969), Olivia Myers (2009)
 3rd runners-up: Lisa Somodi (1992)
 4th runners-up: Mariah Cary (2013)
 Top 10: Lynda Jeanne Formanek (1968), Renee Stuedemann (1973), Lori Froeling (1980), Kerri Rosenberg (1991), Diana Reed (2008), Jessica Pray (2012), Kelly Koch (2017)
 Top 12: Aly Olson (2015), Taylor Wiebers (2016)

Awards

Preliminary awards
 Preliminary Lifestyle & Fitness: Susan Thompson (1969), Catherine Lemkau (1993) (tie), Taylor Wiebers (2016)
 Preliminary Talent: Lisa Somodi (1992), Catherine Lemkau (1993), Diana Reed (2008), Taylor Wiebers (2016)
 Preliminary Social Impact Pitch: Bailey Hodson (2023)

Non-finalist awards
 Non-finalist Talent: Martha Barsness (1957), Joleen Wolf (1963), Carolyn Northway (1964), Marie Mushro (1966), Lois Koth (1970), Cheryl Browne (1971), Jean Bollhoefer (1975), Darla Blocker (1982), Linda Simon (1983), Robin Wolfram (1987), Jayna Sanchez (1990), Lisa Dondlinger (1999), Jennifer Caudle (2000), Carolyn Nicholas (2005), Anne Langguth (2010), Chelsea Dubczak (2018)
 Non-finalist Interview: Pauli Mayfield (2011)

Other awards
 Miss Congeniality: Marie Mushro (1966)
 Miss America Scholar Award: Erin Smith (2002)
 Quality of Life Award 1st runners-up: Theresa Uchytil (2001)
 Quality of Life Award 2nd runners-up: Nancy Van Meter (1994)
 Quality of Life Award Finalists: Anne Langguth (2010)

Winners

Notes

References

External links 
 
List of Miss Iowa winners

Iowa culture
Iowa
Women in Iowa
Annual events in Iowa